The 2014 NCAA Division II men's basketball tournament was a single-elimination tournament involving 64 teams that was played to determine the national champion of men's NCAA Division II college basketball as a culmination of the 2013–14 basketball season.

The eight regional winners met in the Elite Eight for the quarterfinal, semifinal, and championship rounds at the Ford Center in Evansville, Indiana. The championship game was played on March 29, 2014 and was aired nationally on CBS.

The  Central Missouri Mules defeated the West Liberty Hilltoppers, 84–77, to win their second national championship and first since the 1984 NCAA Division II Tournament.

Qualification and tournament format
The champions of 22 of the 24 Division II basketball conferences qualified automatically. The list of automatic qualifying conferences changed as follows from the 2013 tournament:
 The West Virginia Intercollegiate Athletic Conference (WVIAC) disbanded at the end of the 2012–13 school year, with most of the former members forming the Mountain East Conference (MEC) under a new charter. The MEC will not be eligible for an automatic berth until the 2016 tournament.
 The Great American Conference, which began competition in the 2011–12 school year, became eligible for an automatic berth.

In addition to the MEC, the Great Midwest Athletic Conference (G-MAC) was not eligible for an automatic berth. Although the G-MAC began conference competition in 2012–13, it was not officially accepted as a Division II conference until 2013–14, meaning that it will not receive an automatic berth until the 2016 tournament.

An additional 42 teams were selected as at-large participants by the selection committee. As in previous years, the first three rounds of the tournament were organized in regions comprising eight participants in groups of two or three conferences (two in the Atlantic and Central regions) with seeds assigned by the selection committee.  The Elite Eight regional winners met ar one site for the quarterfinals, semifinals, and finals.

Automatic qualifiers
The following teams automatically qualified for the national tournament as the champions of their conference tournaments.

Regionals

East - New Haven, Connecticut
Location: James Moore Fieldhouse Host: Southern Connecticut State University

Central - Mankato,  Minnesota
Location: Taylor Center Host: Minnesota State University, Mankato

South - Lakeland, Florida
Location: Jenkins Field House Host: Florida Southern College

South Central - Denver, Colorado
Location: Auraria Events Center Host: Metropolitan State University

Midwest - Springfield, Missouri
Location: Weiser Gymnasium Host: Drury University

Atlantic - East Stroudsburg, Pennsylvania
Location: Koehler Fieldhouse Host: East Stroudsburg University of Pennsylvania

Southeast - Aiken, South Carolina
Location: USCA Convocation Center Host: University of South Carolina, Aiken

West - San Bernardino, California
Location: James and Aerianthi Coussoulis Arena Host: California State University, San Bernardino

Elite Eight – Evansville, Indiana 
Location: Ford Center Host: University of Southern Indiana

All-tournament team
 Dillon Deck (Central Missouri)
 Shawn Dyer (West Liberty)
 Charles Hammork (Central Missouri)
 Cedric Harris (West Liberty)
 Daylen Robinson (Central Missouri)

References
 2014 NCAA Division II men's basketball tournament jonfmorse.com

NCAA Division II men's basketball tournament
Tournament
NCAA Division II basketball tournament
NCAA Division II basketball tournament